Zhao Tingyang (born 1961 in Guangdong, China) is a political philosopher credited with modernising the ancient Chinese concept of Tianxia.

Biography
Zhao Tingyang graduated from Renmin University of China and Chinese Academy of Social Sciences, and is now a professor in the Institute of Philosophy at the Chinese Academy of Social Sciences and is a senior fellow of Peking University Berggruen Research Institute. He was also a Pusey Distinguished Fellow at the Harvard–Yenching Institute in 2013.

His works are mainly on metaphilosophy, ethics and political philosophy.

In 2005, he published The Tianxia System: An Introduction to the Philosophy of a World Institution. His book Investigations of the Bad World: Political Philosophy as First Philosophy was published in 2009.

According to Zhao's reconstruction of the tianxia system, tianxia presupposed "inclusion of all" and implied acceptance of the world's diversities, emphasizing harmonious reciprocal dependence and ruled by virtue as a means for lasting peace.

Bibliography

Books 

On Possible Life, 1994, 2004
One or All Problem, 1998
The World without a World-view, 2003
The Tianxia System: An Introduction to the Philosophy of a World Institution (Chinese Edition: 2005). ISBN 9787300142654; All under Heaven: The Tianxia System for a Possible World Order. Berkeley: University of California Press. English Edition (2021). ISBN  9780520325029
Investigations of the Bad World: Political Philosophy as First Philosophy, 2009
First Philosophy: From Cogito to Facio, 2012
Contemporary Chinese Political Thought: Debates and Perspectives

Selected academic articles

Zhao Tingyang. 2012. ‘The Ontology of Coexistence: From Cogito to Facio’. Diogenes 57:4, (228): 27-36
Zhao Tingyang and Yan Xin. 2008. The Self and the Other: An Unanswered Question in Confucian Theory. Frontiers of Philosophy in China 3, (2): 163-176
Zhao Tingyang. 2009. Ontology of Coexistence. Diogenes 228, (4): 35-49
Zhao Tingyang. 2009. A Political World Philosophy in terms of All-under-Heaven (tian-xia). Diogenes 56, (1): 5–18, 140
Zhao Tingyang. 2006. Rethinking Empire from a Chinese Concept 'All-under-Heaven' (tian-xia). Social identities 12, (1): 29-41
Zhao Tingyang. 2007. ‘“Credit Human Rights”: A Non-western Theory of Universal Human Rights’. Social sciences in China XXVIII, (1): 14-26
Zhao Tingyang. 2005. On the Best Possible Golden Rule. Social sciences in China XXVI, (4): 12-22

See also
 Panarchy
 Cosmopolitanism

References

External links
Zhao's Web Page
The Implications of "Tianxia" as a New World System (US-China Institute)

1961 births
Writers from Shantou
Philosophers from Guangdong
Living people
People's Republic of China philosophers
People's Republic of China essayists
Renmin University of China alumni
Chinese Academy of Social Sciences alumni